Eagle Mountain, also known as Eagle Ridge, is the mountainous ridge with many indistinct summits between Buntzen Lake and Coquitlam Lake near Coquitlam, British Columbia. Its proximity to Coquitlam, and the houses being built on its southern slopes (known as Westwood Plateau), make it a very popular weekend destination for hiking, mountain biking, horseback riding, and ATV riding. There is a network of logging roads leading up the south side of the summit to a plateau area with lakes, hiking trails and mountain biking trails.

This tunnel, and the power plants on Indian Arm are still operational.

Eagle Mountain is in Indian Arm Provincial Park.

References

External links
 
 

Landforms of Coquitlam
One-thousanders of British Columbia
Pacific Ranges
New Westminster Land District